Captain Corelli's Mandolin, released simultaneously in the United States as Corelli's Mandolin, is a 1994 novel by the British writer Louis de Bernières, set on the Greek island of Cephalonia during the Italian and German occupation of the Second World War.

The main characters are Antonio Corelli, an Italian army captain, and Pelagia, the daughter of the local physician, Dr Iannis. An important event in the novel is the massacre of Italian troops by the Germans in September 1943—the Italian Acqui Division had refused to surrender and had fought the Germans for nine days before running out of ammunition. Some 1,500 Italian soldiers died in the fighting; 5,000 were massacred after surrendering, and the rest were shipped to Germany, of whom 3,000 drowned when the ship carrying them hit a mine.

In 2003, the novel was listed at number 19 on the BBC's survey The Big Read.

Synopsis

The story begins with Dr. Iannis, a multilingual doctor with an established practice on the Greek island of Cephalonia. Iannis lives with his daughter Pelagia; Pelagia's mother died of tuberculosis. Pelagia, now a young woman, is headstrong and intelligent, and has learned about medicine by observing her father.

Pelagia meets a young fisherman named Mandras, and they become engaged. War has been declared, and Mandras decides to go fight at the front. Pelagia's letters to him go unanswered.

Meanwhile, Carlo Guercio fights among the Italian forces that invade Albania, and sees his beloved friend, Francesco,  with whom he is in love,  shot by the Greek army during the Greco-Italian War.

In 1941, Italian and German soldiers are posted to Cephalonia, where they are ostracized by the locals. Pelagia is determined to hate them, especially when a jovial young captain by the name of Antonio Corelli is domiciled with her. Mandras comes home from the war, injured and filthy, and as Pelagia nurses him she realizes she no longer loves him. Mandras leaves for the Greek mainland, where he joins the communist partisan organisation ELAS. ELAS is cruel towards the civilian population and more frequently attacks other partisan groups (for being ideologically different) than the Axis' occupying forces.

After Mussolini loses power, Italy joins forces with the Allies. The Italians who occupy Greece thus are freed from their duties. After defeating the Italian division, the German soldiers on Cephalonia turn on them, and order a massive execution. Corelli's life is saved by Carlo Guercio, who shields him with his body when they face execution by firing squad. Guercio dies, and the wounded Corelli is aided by a Greek back to Pelagia's house. Corelli has to stay hidden from the Germans, whose orders are to kill any surviving Italians.

As soon as he is well enough, Corelli escapes to Italy, promising Pelagia that he will return as soon as the war ends and then they will be married. Corelli leaves Antonia, his mandolin, with Pelagia for safekeeping.

The Germans become brutal but the war eventually ends. Communists take over the island for a period of time (and large parts of Greece in general) and mistreat the population. Dr Iannis is considered an intellectual, therefore suspect, and is sent to a camp along with some of his friends who protest against his treatment. Mandras returns, indoctrinated with Communist ideologies and having learned to read. He has read Pelagia's letters and knows that she does not love him, so he tries to rape her. This is prevented by the fact that Pelagia is armed, and by intervention of Mandras' mother who realizes what almost happened and repudiates her own son. Ashamed, he commits suicide. Mandras' mother comforts Pelagia and for the remainder of her life, remains close with Pelagia.

Some time after, a baby girl is left on Pelagia's doorstep, whom Pelagia adopts. Dr Iannis comes home, traumatised. Life goes on in Cephalonia, though interrupted by the 1953 Ionian earthquake, in which Iannis dies.

Corelli does not return, though Pelagia is convinced she sees his ghost. The baby girl, whom Pelagia has named Antonia, grows up and marries. Antonia later has a son who is named Iannis in honor of the doctor.

Many years later, an old man visits Pelagia. It is Antonio Corelli, now a famous mandolin player. He explains that he did not visit before because, having seen her with baby Antonia on her doorstep and believing her to be married, he was bitter. The novel ends on a happy note.

Major themes
Captain Corelli's Mandolin explores many varieties of love. We see the initial lust-based love between Pelagia and Mandras, which burns out as a result of the war, and the change it prompts in both of them. Corelli and Pelagia's slow-developing love is the central focus of the novel. Love is described by Dr Iannis as "what is left when the passion has gone", and it certainly appears that this criterion is fulfilled by the love of Corelli and Pelagia. The paternal love of Iannis for Pelagia is also strong and is heavily compared with that of Corelli.

The theme of music is predominant, offering a direct contrast to the horror and destruction that the war brings and showing how something beautiful can arise from something horrible.

The war is described in graphic detail, particularly the death of Francesco. It is responsible for the fall of Mandras and Weber, the deaths of Carlo and Francesco, and the separation of Pelagia and Corelli.

Throughout the novel, Bernières takes a harsh view of all forms of totalitarianism, condemning Fascism, Nazism, and Communism alike. Bernières himself described this as a novel about "what happens to the little people when megalomaniacs get busy."

Another theme of the novel is the study of history. Dr Iannis spends much of his spare time attempting to write a history of Cephalonia, but he often finds his personal feelings and biases running through whatever he writes. There is also a strong feeling against 'professional' history, which is suggested by Carlo Guercio's statement that "I know that if we [the Axis] win then there will be stories about mass graves in London and vice versa". This is reinforced by a quotation from Bernières which says that: "history ought to be made up of the stories of ordinary people only." From this viewpoint, it can be seen that Bernières is very much a revisionist historian, considering social history superior to political history.

Bernières takes an ambiguous attitude towards heroism and villainy in the novel: many of the characters, despite committing atrocities, are viewed as human victims of bad circumstances. For example, the German character Günter Weber receives a great degree of sympathy from the writer, even though he fully engages with the Nazi ideology and is guilty of taking part in the killing of an entire Italian division. Despite having become friends with many of the men, Weber must follow orders. Similarly, Mandras is guilty of murder, torture, and rape, yet the author portrays him sympathetically: "just another life tarnished... by war."

References
Near the end of the novel, in Chapter 62, Pelagia receives a photograph from Günter Weber and written on the back is a passage in German from Goethe's Faust, "Gretchen am Spinnrad," which is also a popular German Lied, set to music by Schubert. It reads:
Meine Ruh ist hin,
Mein Herz ist schwer,
Ich finde sie nimmer
und nimmermehr.

Which translates as:
My peace is gone,
My heart is sore [lit. "heavy"],
I will find it never
and nevermore.

Real story and precedents
Bernières has denied that the character of Corelli is based on Amos Pampaloni who was then an Italian artillery captain in Cephalonia, despite the many similarities in their stories. Pampaloni survived execution, joined the Greek People's Liberation Army, the Partisans in the Greek civil war, and fought with them in Epirus for fourteen months. Pampaloni was interviewed by The Guardian newspaper in 2000 and expressed the view that the novel misrepresented the Greek partisan movement.

The novel also shows some similarities to Bandiera bianca a Cefalonia, a novel by Marcello Venturi published in 1963, translated in English as The White Flag (1969).

Reception
The Orlando Sentinel called Corelli's Mandolin a "radically traditionalist" novel, "a good nourishing tale full of true things, historical and psychological, spiced with opinion and contrariness, with not one dollop of regard for artistic fashion."

The Cleveland Plain Dealer praised the multiple emotional levels of the novel, remarking, "Like Puccini, de Bernières can evoke golden narrative, full of both pain and gladness."

Gene Hyde wrote, "To defy Sisyphus and rebel against the absurd, especially in the face of war, is an excruciatingly difficult and noble task. The beauty of Bernières' unique and deeply moving novel is his insistence that our hope lies in these seemingly quixotic impulses."

Awards
1995 – Commonwealth Writers Prize for Best Book

2004 – 19th place on The Big Read

Adaptations

Radio
The novel was adapted as four 45-minute radio plays from 17–20 September 2007 on BBC Radio 4, having been chosen as a popular "Book of the Week" on the same station some years earlier. The episode titles were "A Pea in the Ear," "Invasion of the Italians," "Looking for Snails" and "Earthquake." It was narrated by Tom Goodman-Hill, with Celia Meiras as Pelagia, Stephen Greif as Dr Iannis, Daniel Philpott as Corelli. The mandolin music for it was composed and performed by Alison Stephens, and the production was produced and directed by David Hunter. Other cast members included:
Carlo – Anthony Psaila
Mandras – Chris Pavlo
Velisarios – Alexi Kaye Campbell
Father Arsenios – Alex Zorbas
Lemoni – Ania Gordon
Drosoula – Anna Savva
Hector – Nitin Ganatra
Officer – Simon Treves

Film

A film version of Captain Corelli's Mandolin was released in 2001, with Nicolas Cage as the Italian Captain Corelli, John Hurt as Dr Iannis, and Penélope Cruz as his daughter, Pelagia. The film, directed by John Madden, also starred Christian Bale, Irene Papas and Joanna Daria Adraktas.

Theatre
In 2011, the Mercury Theatre in Colchester, England, and the Kote Marjanishvili Theatre of Tbilisi, Georgia, produced an adaptation of the novel written by Mike Maran and directed by Levan Tsuladze. This production combined live actors and puppetry. It had its premiere in Georgia at the Tbilisi International Festival in October 2011, before transferring to the Mercury.

A new stage adaptation by Rona Munro and directed by Melly Still previews at the Leicester Curve from 13 to 20 April 2019 before opening at the Rose Theatre, Kingston (23 April to 12 May), and touring to Theatre Royal, Bath (14 to 18 May), Birmingham Repertory Theatre (29 May to 15 June), King's Theatre, Edinburgh (18 to 22 June) and Theatre Royal, Glasgow (25 to 29 June). Following its UK tour, the production transferred to London's West End at the Harold Pinter Theatre from 4 July to 31 August 2019 starring Alex Mugnaioni as Captain Antonio Corelli and Madison Clare as Pelagia.

References

External links

1994 British novels
British novels adapted into films
British novels adapted into plays
Cephalonia
Cultural depictions of Benito Mussolini
English novels
Italian occupation of Greece during World War II
Novels adapted into radio programs
Novels by Louis de Bernières
Novels set in Greece during World War II
Novels set on islands
Secker & Warburg books